Nicola Regitano (died 1533) was a Roman Catholic prelate who served as Bishop of Nicastro (1533).

Biography
On 3 Mar 1533, Nicola Regitano was appointed during the papacy of Pope Clement VII as Bishop of Nicastro.
He served as Bishop of Nicastro until his death in Sep 1533.

References

External links and additional sources
 (for Chronology of Bishops) 
 (for Chronology of Bishops)  

16th-century Italian Roman Catholic bishops
Bishops appointed by Pope Clement VII
1533 deaths